Charles Joseph Hawkins (born December 16, 1981) is a former American football tight end for the Indianapolis Colts of the National Football League.

1981 births
Living people
American football tight ends
People from Gilmer, Texas
Texas Tech Red Raiders football players
Indianapolis Colts players
Texas Tech Red Raiders basketball players
American men's basketball players